Tarkiln Bayou Preserve State Park is a  preserve, a unit of Florida State Park located  southwest of Pensacola, in northwestern Florida. It is home to four species of endangered pitcher plants, as well as other rare and endangered plant species. The rare, carnivorous white–top pitcher plant is unique to the Gulf Coast and found only between the Apalachicola and Mississippi rivers. Almost 100 other rare plants and animals depend on the wet prairie habitat, including the alligator snapping turtle, sweet pitcher plant, and Chapman's butterwort.

Recreational Activities
A half-mile long ADA boardwalk to Tarkiln Bayou allows visitors to experience some of western Florida's most wild and beautiful natural areas. Visitors can picnic or hike on one of the nature trails to observe the rare plants and animals. For the more adventurous, visitors can take a day–hike across the park to the Perdido River which separates Florida from Alabama.

Gallery

References

External links
 Florida State Parks

Parks in Escambia County, Florida
State parks of Florida